Trasfigurazione di Nostro Signore Gesù Cristo is a 20th-century parochial church and titular church in the western suburbs of Rome, dedicated to the Transfiguration of Jesus.

History 

The church was built in 1934–36, designed by Tullio Rossi. Behind the altar is a reproduction of Raphael's Transfiguration.

The martyr Fr. Andrea Santoro (1945–2006) was priest at Trasfigurazione di Nostro Signore Gesù Cristo in 1971–81.

On 21 February 2001, it was made a titular church to be held by a cardinal-priest.

Cardinal-Protectors
Pedro Rubiano Sáenz (2001–present)

See also
Church of the Transfiguration

References

External links

Titular churches
Rome S. VIII Gianicolense
Roman Catholic churches completed in 1936
20th-century Roman Catholic church buildings in Italy